is a Japanese politician of the Constitutional Democratic Party of Japan and a member of the House of Representatives in the Diet (national legislature).

Biography 
A native of Shintoku, Hokkaido and a graduate of Chuo University, he was elected to the House of Representatives for the first time in 2017 after having served in the Hokkaido Prefectural Assembly for three terms. Michishita was elected in the Hokkaido 1st district, succeeding longtime representative and former Governor of Hokkaido, Takahiro Yokomichi. He started his career as a secretary in Yokomichi's Sapporo office back in 1998.

References

External links 
Official website in Japanese.

1975 births
Living people
Politicians from Hokkaido
Members of the House of Representatives (Japan)
Constitutional Democratic Party of Japan politicians
Democratic Party of Japan politicians
21st-century Japanese politicians
Members of the Hokkaido Prefectural Assembly